English Freakbeat, Volume 1 is a compilation album in the English Freakbeat series, featuring recordings that were released decades earlier, in the mid-1960s.

Release data
The album was released as an LP in 1988 by AIP Records (as #AIP-10039) and as a CD in 1992 (as #AIP-CD-1039).

Vinyl-only tracks and CD bonus tracks
The English Freakbeat LPs and CDs have most tracks in common, although some of the LP tracks were not included on the CDs; also, the CD bonus tracks are not always at the end of the album.  Thus, for clarity, we have shown tracks for both editions of the album, with vinyl-only tracks and CD bonus tracks indicated.

Notes on the tracks
The following information is taken mostly from the CD liner notes.

The Groundhogs released a dozen albums as a progressive blues band between 1968 and 1976 without gaining deserved stardom, though that incarnation of the band was not started until 1967.  The band initially formed in late 1963 with the name John Lee's Groundhogs after backing U.S. bluesman John Lee Hooker on tour in England.  "Shake It" comes from their first of two singles; it was released in the U.S. but not the U.K.

"Don't Want That" by the Betterdays is the only song on the original release of this album as an LP that does not appear on the CD.  Their cover of Bo Diddley's "Here 'Tis" that was included on the earlier Pebbles, Volume 6 LP is also among the vinyl-only tracks on that album that were not included on the English Freakbeat, Volume 6 CD.

The In-Be-Tweens, a predecessor band to Slade, were also known as the N-Betweens and the In-Between and came from Wolverhampton.  The band was discovered by American punk entrepreneur Kim Fowley, who was the co-writer on this song.

Five songs on the CD come from The Primitives (originally known as Mal & the Primitives), a Northampton band whose members included Michael Wilding, Elizabeth Taylor's son with actor Michael Wilding.  The band was mostly based in Italy, where they issued two albums.  Singer Mal Ryder previously appeared with the Spirits on four pop singles in 1963-1965 and later had a successful career as a solo artist in the 1970s.  Another song by the Primitives is included on English Freakbeat, Volume 4, along with one of the early Mal Ryder and the Spirits tracks.

The Loot has several strong connections with the Troggs; bandmember Dave Wright was one of the original members of that band, and "Baby Come Closer", from the first single, was later recorded by the Troggs.  Also, their label, Page One Records was owned by Troggs manager Larry Page; and Ronnie Bond, the drummer for the Troggs produced many of the songs by the Loot.  Three members of this band were previously in the Soul Agents, featured on English Freakbeat, Volume 2.

Miki Dallon is perhaps better known for his songwriting and producing work, although he was also a solo artist beginning with a debut single in February 1965 called "Do You Call that Love".  His first hit as a songwriter and producer was "Take a Heart" b/w "You Got What I Want" by the Boys Blue, which was ranked #38 on the Fab 40 in July 1965.  Both sides achieved even greater success shortly thereafter with the versions by the Sorrows.  Dallon later wrote several other songs for the Sorrows, who returned the favor by backing him on several of his solo singles, reportedly including this song (although the claim is disputed by others).

Chris Andrews discovered the Chasers in his home town of Romford; this track is from their second of three singles.  Lead guitarist Len Tuckey would later join the Riot Squad and the Nashville Teens, as well as the backing band for Suzi Quatro; they eventually married.

"Take Away" is the flip side of the Couriers' only single; the "A" side is on English Freakbeat, Volume 3.

Members of the Rats included a young Mick Ronson.  This song is the flip side of their final single (on Laurie Records); the "A" side was "Gotta See My Baby Everyday".  On the U.K. issue, "Headin' Back" is called "New Orleans"; Mike Stax of Ugly Things fanzine states that the two songs differ only in their title, but this album's liner notes suggest otherwise.  Another track by the Rats is given on the Pebbles, Volume 6 LP.

"Purple Pill Eaters" is a commentary on the pill-popping habits of young Mod teenagers and is reminiscent of Macy Skipper's "Bop Pills" (which can be found on Born Bad, Volume 5) about the similar lifestyle choices in the rockabilly scene in the U.S.  The song itself is a reworking of the 1958 novelty song "Purple People Eater", and the warning in the chorus – "don't eat the purple pills, my boy" – calls to mind the famous advisory about the "brown acid" at Woodstock.

Birds Birds were originally called the Thunderbirds and, after changing their name to the Birds, brought a lawsuit against the Byrds when they arrived in England in 1965, in an unsuccessful attempt to get them to change their name.  The album closes with both sides of their last 45, which was issued under the new name.  The leaders of the band were Ron Wood, who next moved to the Jeff Beck Group before gaining international fame with the Faces and the Rolling Stones; and Kim Gardner, who joined The Creation.

Track listing

LP

Side 1:

 The Groundhogs: "Shake It" — rel. 1964
 Johnny Neal and the Starliners: "Walk Baby Walk" — rel. 1965
 The In-be-tweens: "Girl, I Am Your Evil Witchman"
 The Betterdays: "Don't Want That" — rel. 1965, vinyl-only track
 The Rebounds: "Help Me"
 The Primitives: "Help Me" — rel. 1964
 The Primitives: "Let Them Tell"
 The Beat Merchants: "Pretty Face" (McKinley Morganfield)

Side 2:

 Steve Davies: "She Said Yeah" — rel. 1968
 The Loot: "Baby Come Closer" — rel. 1967
 Miki Dallon: "I'll Give You Love" — rel. 1965
 The Chasers: "Inspiration" — rel. 1966
 The Sheffields: "Plenty of Love" — rel. 1964
 The Couriers: "Done Me Wrong"
 The Rats: "Headin' Back"
 The Wild Ones: "Purple Pill Eater" — rel. 1964

CD
 The Groundhogs: "Shake It" — rel. 1964
 Johnny Neal & Starliners: "Walk Baby Walk" — rel. 1965
 The In-Be-Tweens: "Girl, I Am Your Evil Witchman"
 The Rebounds: "Help Me"
 The Primitives: "Help Me" — rel. 1964
 The Primitives: "Let Them Tell"
 The Beat Merchants: "Pretty Face" (McKinley Morganfield)
 Steve Davies: "She Said Yeah" — rel. 1968
 The Loot: "Baby Come Closer" — rel. 1967
 Miki Dallon: "I'll Give You Love" — rel. 1965
 The Chasers: "Inspiration" — rel. 1966
 The Sheffields: "Plenty of Love" — rel. 1964
 The Couriers: "Done Me Wrong"
 The Rats: "Headin' Back"
 The Wild Ones: "Purple Pill Eater" — rel. 1964
 The Primitives: "Yeeeeeeh!", CD bonus track – listed on the booklet but not actually on the CD
 The Primitives: "Cara-Lin", CD bonus track
 The Primitives: "Forget It", CD bonus track; actually by Mal Ryder & the Spirits
 Birds Birds: "Say Those Magic Words" — rel. 1966, CD bonus track
 Birds Birds: "Daddy Daddy" — rel. 1966, CD bonus track

1988 compilation albums
Compilation albums by British artists
Pop rock compilation albums
Psychedelic rock compilation albums